La Sib (also Romanized as Lā Sīb; also known as Lāseb) is a village in Olya Rural District, in the Central District of Ardestan County, Isfahan Province, Iran. At the 2006 census, its population was 148, in 48 families.

References 

Populated places in Ardestan County